is a district located in Aomori Prefecture, Japan.  It occupies the east-central portion of the prefecture, south of Shimokita Peninsula.

As of 2010, the district has an estimated population of 100,526 and a density of 78.5 persons per km2. The total area was 1281.05 km2. In terms of national politics, the district is represented in the Diet of Japan's House of Representatives as a part of the Aomori 1st district and the Aomori 2nd district.

Towns and villages
The district currently consists of six towns and one village. The cities of Towada and Misawa were formerly part of the district.

Noheji
Oirase
Rokunohe
Shichinohe
Tōhoku
Yokohama
Rokkasho

History
Kamikita District was part of ancient , established by the Northern Fujiwara. During the Edo period, the area was part of the Morioka han feudal domain of the Nanbu clan, with daikansho located in Noheji and Shichinohe.

The Nanbu clan sided with the Ōuetsu Reppan Dōmei during the Boshin War of the Meiji Restoration and were punished by the new Meiji government by loss of their northern territories. In November 1869, Kita-gun and neighboring Sannohe District became part of the newly created , a 30,000 koku holding created to resettle the dispossessed Matsudaira clan from Aizu-Wakamatsu. In July 1871, with the abolition of the han system, Tonami Domain became Tonami Prefecture, and was merged into the newly created Aomori Prefecture in September 1871.

During the early Meiji period administrative reorganization of Japan on July 22, 1878, Kamikita and Shimokita were divided from former Kita County, and Kamikita was divided into 50 villages. In the cadastral reform of April 1, 1889, the number of villages was reduced through consolidations and mergers to sixteen.

 On September 27, 1897 the village of Noheji was elevated to town status.
 On September 1, 1902 the village of Shichinohe was elevated to town status.
 On September 1, 1910 the village of Sanbongi was elevated to town status.
 On April 20, 1929 the village of Momoishi was elevated to town status.
 On February 1, 1948 several villages or portions of villages were merged to create the town of Omisawa.
 On February 1, 1956 the town of Sanbongi was elevated to city status.
 On April 1, 1956 the village of Towada was elevated to town status.
 On October 1, 1957 the village of Rokunohe was elevated to town status.
 On April 1, 1958 the village of Yokohama was elevated to town status.
 On September 1, 1958 the town of Omisawa was elevated to city status and became the city of Misawa.
 On September 1, 1958 the village of Uranodate was elevated to town status and became the town of Kamikita.
 On August 1, 1969 the village of Shimoda was elevated to town status.
 On April 1, 1975 the town of Towada was renamed as the town of Towadako.
 On January 1, 2005 the town of Towadako was merged into the city of Tiowada.
 On March 1, 2005 the towns of Shimoda and Momishi were merged to create the town of Oirase.

References

Districts in Aomori Prefecture